Anthony Louis Cannava (May 24, 1924 – September 24, 2017) was an American football halfback/defensive back in the National Football League who played for the Green Bay Packers. He was born in Medford, Massachusetts and was an all-star running back at Medford High School. He then entered the U.S. Navy in the midst of World War II. In 1944 his ship was sunk by the Japanese and he survived several days at sea before rescue. He was decorated by Franklin Roosevelt for his service. Cannava entered the NFL after playing college ball at Boston College.  He played one game for the Packers in the 1950 season, and then retired from professional football. He died on September 24, 2017, at the age of 93.

References

1924 births
2017 deaths
American football halfbacks
American football defensive backs
Notre Dame Fighting Irish football players
Green Bay Packers players
Players of American football from Boston
United States Navy personnel of World War II